Six Flags Great Escape and Hurricane Harbor is an amusement and water park owned and operated by Six Flags. It was one of three Six Flags parks not to be officially branded with the "Six Flags" name until 2022, with La Ronde in Montreal, Quebec, Canada, and Frontier City in Oklahoma City, Oklahoma, being the last two without the Six Flags branding.

History

The Great Escape was opened in 1954 as Storytown USA, a Mother Goose themed amusement park by businessman Charles Wood who bought the land with his wife for $75,000. In 1957, realizing that the park was geared only toward small children, the park opened its Ghost Town area, the first of many themed areas opened in the park's history.

For publicity, the park placed bumper stickers on every car in the parking lot. This practice stopped a few years later due to complaints and employees switched to attaching cardboard versions with wire. This was when a car bumper was separate from the body and one could get all the way around it with wire. In 1983, the park officially changed its name from Storytown USA to The Great Escape.

In 1984, The Great Escape opened the Steamin' Demon, the first of its eventual seven roller coasters. The showpiece attraction at The Great Escape is the Comet. Re-opened at The Great Escape in 1994, this roller coaster already had a 41-year history as The Comet at Crystal Beach (an amusement park near Niagara Falls, Ontario). It was saved shortly after the park closed down forever after the 1988 season. Charley Wood, the owner of Great Escape Fun Park and Fantasy Island in Grand Island, New York successfully bid for The Comet and it sat in storage for a few years in Fantasy Island before making its way to the park in Queensbury, NY and reopening in 1994. Roller coaster enthusiasts recognize it as one of the best wooden roller coasters in North America.

In 1996, Charles Wood sold the park to Premier Parks who would later go on to purchase the Six Flags company. Unlike many parks during that time, Great Escape was not rebranded or flagged as a Six Flags park.

In February 2006, The Six Flags Great Escape Lodge & Indoor Waterpark opened up with positive reviews and sold-out weekends throughout the first month. This major addition includes a  waterpark exclusively for lodge guests. This is New York State's first indoor waterpark.

The park debuted several new features for the 2006 season. These included character greetings from the likes of the whole Justice League.

For the 2007 season, The Great Escape re-themed their dive show to a pirate-themed show, branded their pizza restaurant a Papa John's, and brought back the Superstars and Legends: Elvis! Show (which featured throughout the summer not only Elvis, but also Buddy Holly, and Billy Joel) to JollyTree Theatre.

This also featured a fire diver.

Other milestones include:
1954 — Charles Wood opens Storytown USA.
1957 — Ghost Town section of the park is opened.
1960 — Jungleland section of the park is opened.
1967 — Alice in Wonderland walk through adventure is opened.
1971 — First roller coaster introduced, The Italian Coaster
1972 — Tilt-a-Whirl, Tip-Top.  New restaurant, Johnnie Appleseed, by main entrance. The Kula Hut, restaurant near Jungle Land, added.
1973 — Dolphin show (returned in 1974, 1975)  
1975 — "Cowboy School House" where a cowboy teaches tricks of the trade. Arcade in Ghost Town with arcade games and $100,000 shooting gallery.
1982 — Addition of about eight adult spinning rides.
1983 — Name change from Storytown USA to Great Escape Fun Park along with the addition of a few other adult rides.
1984 — Addition of Steamin' Demon, an Arrow Development 3-inversion roller coaster, which was previously installed at Pontchartrain Beach as Ragin' Cajun.
1986 — Opening of Raging River, an Intamin river rafting ride.
1994 — A used wooden track and steel frame roller coaster called the Comet was brought from Crystal Beach Park and reassembled at Great Escape and opened, giving the park three roller coasters.
1995 — Great Escape opens its water park, Splashwater Kingdom.
1996 — Acquisition by Premier Parks, which later bought and changed its name to Six Flags.
1997 — Addition of Boomerang: Coast to Coaster, a Vekoma Boomerang. Was and currently is still the tallest roller coaster at the park.
1998 — Addition of Alpine Bobsled, an Intamin alpine-themed bobsled roller coaster (Previously located at Six Flags Great America from 1990 to 1995 as Rolling Thunder and Six Flags Great Adventure as Sarajevo Bobsleds from 1984 to 1988).
1999 — Addition of Nightmare at Crack Axle Canyon, an indoor Schwarzkopf Jet Star featuring four-person cars, but only operated with two people. The building is still standing. The coaster was previously located at Beech Bend Park, Kentucky Kingdom and Darien Lake, respectively as Starchaser, Starchaser and Nightmare at Phantom cave.
2003 — Addition of Canyon Blaster, a Mine Train roller coaster built by Arrow Development and transported from defunct Opryland USA. This replaces the Ghost Town Train and Tornado Dark Ride.
2004 — The Great Escape's 50th Anniversary.
2005 — Debut of Looney Tunes National Park: a Looney Tunes themed children's area which included eight new children's rides, including Road Runner Express, the park's seventh roller coaster and a re-themed restaurant as well as a cartoon walk-through. Replaces the old Jungleland area. Accompanying Looney Tunes National Park are the Looney Tunes characters. The Flash Pass system is introduced.
2007 — The Tornado opens in Splashwater Kingdom.
2008 — Wiggles World Children's Theme Area and The Mega Wedgie, a Proslide Bowl. At the Great Escape Lodge, The Trapper's restaurant is converted to a Johnny Rockets, serving breakfast, lunch and dinner.
2009 — Addition of Sasquatch, an S&S Power Combo Tower. Relocated from Six Flags New Orleans. This ride is located at the previous site of the Rainbow. Martha's Dandee Creme sold back to its original owners. The park hosted the first Holiday in the Park (Christmas event) during the weekends in November and December.

2010 — Old theme elements from the park's Storytown USA era, including PoPo the Purple Cow and a rebuilt Cinderella's castle, were restored and placed back into the park. The Holiday In The Park (Christmas event) was cancelled for the 2010 season. In late 2010, Six Flags began the process of removing licensed theming from attractions. The Great Escape would terminate their license with The Wiggles, with Wiggles' World being rethemed to KIDZOPOLIS starting in the 2011 season. The Great Escape also terminated their licenses with both Looney Tunes and DC Comics despite Six Flags having the rights to use the characters in their parks. Looney Tunes National Park was rethemed to Timbertown and the Flash Pass system was renamed to Go Fast Pass, all in time for the 2011 season.
2012 — Alpine Freefalls opened in Splashwater Kingdom. It features Twisted Racer (a ProSlide KrakenRacer) and Cliffhanger (a trapdoor released ProSlide speed slide). Name change from The Great Escape & Splashwater Kingdom to its former name, Great Escape.
2013 — Addition of Screamin' Eagles, a new Flying Scooters family ride, located in Fest Area next to Alice in Wonderland attraction. It Replaces the former Cinema 180/Arcade attraction The Bumper Cars are relocated to Ghost Town. 'Blizzard' is relocated into the old dome to once again become an indoor scrambler ride. In July 2013, The Pink Whale (removed in 2005) returns with a new location, only to take photos in. The Canyon Blaster's train is turned around in July, forcing riders to face the back of the ride. Animals from a shelter come and perform a show called Pet's Overboard for June 22 to July 7.
2014 — Addition of Extreme Supernova Six Flags buys full ownership of the lodge. New suites introduced.
2015 — Addition of Buccaneer Beach, a children's pirate-themed water area.
2016 — Greezed Lightnin' opens across from Thunder Alley & Flashback. The area gets renamed Hot Rod USA. Boomerang gets renamed to Flashback. 
2017 — Addition of Bonzai Pipelines to the existing Alpine Freefalls complex in Splashwater Kingdom.
2018 — Addition of Pandemonium, a Chance Rides Freestyle.
2019 — Splashwater Kingdom is transformed and renamed Hurricane Harbor debuting two new attractions: Bucket Blasters and Shipwreck Cove.
2020 — On September 11, 2020, the park announced on its social media channels that it would remain closed for the 2020 season due to the COVID-19 pandemic. All season passes and tickets were carried over to the 2021 season.
2021 — Addition of Adirondack Outlaw, a  Funtime Volmatron ride, originally scheduled to debut for the 2020 season. The entrance for the Steamin' Demon is redesigned and the decision is made to retire the Giant Wheel.
2022 — Front entrance to be renovated and redesigned.

Rides and attractions

Themed areas

Fest Area
This area typically features a German theme. German-style music can be heard playing throughout this area along with other 'German' food stands such as funnel cake.

Ghost Town

International Village and Storytown / Hot Rod USA

Timbertown
This section opened in 2005 as Looney Tunes National Park.

Six Flags Hurricane Harbor

Upcharge attractions
These rides are not included in the admission price. Cost varies from ride to ride.

Other attractions
Alice in Wonderland - A walk-through attraction based on the Lewis Carroll classic of the same name, located in Fest Area, which opened in 1967.

Special events
After Labor Day Six Flags Great Escape and Hurricane Harbor has two special events, Oktoberfest and Fright Fest, before closing for the winter. Oktoberfest is held during the weekends in September, while Fright Fest is held Fridays thru Sundays in October.

Oktoberfest is marginally a celebration of German heritage but is expanded to include ethnic foods, various beer games, ethnic music and dancing and other activities. (In the past, vendors were included, but none since 2006).

Fright Fest has the entire park decorated for Halloween, while many of the usual shows are changed over to Halloween events as well including trick or treating among the miniature houses in Ghost-town and 4 elaborate haunted houses, which are located near the North-woods Picnic Grove and in the Ghost Town.

In 2009, The Great Escape experimented with a late-season festival named "Holiday in the Park". It included live entertainment and holiday-themed shows, lights adorning the park and a sledding hill making it the winter equivalent of the Fright Fest autumn event. Though Six Flags called the 2009 event successful, it also claimed a "business decision" was the reason behind the cancellation of the "Holiday in the Park" for the 2010 season.

Defunct rides and attractions

References

External links 

Official Six Flags Great Escape Website

Amusement parks in New York (state)
Queensbury, New York
Six Flags amusement parks
 
Splashwater Kingdom
Water parks in New York (state)
Buildings and structures in Warren County, New York
Tourist attractions in Warren County, New York
1954 establishments in New York (state)
Amusement parks opened in 1954